The United States competed at the 1988 Winter Olympics in Calgary, Alberta, Canada.

Medalists 

The following U.S. competitors won medals at the games. In the by discipline sections below, medalists' names are bolded. 

| width="78%" align="left" valign="top" |

| width=22% align=left valign=top |

Competitors
The following is the list of number of competitors in the Games.

Alpine skiing

Timed events
Men

Women

Combined
Men

Women

Biathlon

Bobsleigh

Cross-country skiing

Men

Women

Figure skating

Individual

Mixed

Ice hockey

Summary

Roster
Scott Fusco
Corey Millen
Greg Brown
Guy Gosselin
Clark Donatelli
Jim Johannson
Peter Laviolette
Scott Young
Brian Leetch
Mike Richter
Jeff Norton
Eric Weinrich
Dave Snuggerud
Allen Bourbeau
Kevin Stevens
Tony Granato
Craig Janney
Steve Leach
Lane MacDonald
Kevin Miller
Todd Okerlund
Chris Terreri
Dave Peterson (Head coach)

First round
Top three teams (shaded ones) entered the medal round.

 USA 10-6 Austria
 Czechoslovakia 7-5 USA
 Soviet Union 7-5 USA
 USA 6-3 Norway
 West Germany 4-1 USA

7th place game

|}

Luge

Men

Women

Nordic combined

Ski jumping

Speed skating

Men

Women

References

Official Olympic Reports
 Olympic Winter Games 1988, full results by sports-reference.com
 

Nations at the 1988 Winter Olympics
1988
Oly